LoJack is a stolen vehicle recovery and IoT connected car system that utilizes GPS and cellular technology to locate users' vehicles, view trip history, see battery levels, track speeding, and maintain vehicle health via a native app. Prior to selling a vehicle, LoJack dealers can use the system to manage and locate inventory, view and manage battery health, and recover stolen inventory.

History
The original LoJack system was created and patented in 1979 by William Reagan, a former Medfield, Massachusetts police commissioner, who went on to establish LoJack Corporation in Medfield. Reagan served as the company's first CEO and Chairman. The name "LoJack" was coined to be the "antithesis of hijack", wherein "hijack" refers to the theft of a vehicle through force.

The original LoJack was a hardware and radio based system designed to prevent theft of a vehicle and aid in the vehicle’s recovery by transmitting vehicle location to the LoJack receiver. It was installed in the vehicle and connected to the starting mechanism such that only the original key would start the vehicle.  It could also include the incorporation of a scheme whereby an additional step was required to activate the ignition.  Prior to starting, it would require the activation of any number of the usual vehicle features such as the radio, headlight switch, or other switched device.  Without knowledge of the proper procedure, it would be almost impossible to activate the ignition.  Modern transponder key based systems made the original LoJack starting system obsolete, so it was changed to be only a cell phone/GPS based stolen vehicle tracking and recovery system.  When a vehicle is stolen, the device transmits data to the LoJack base and includes speed, location, and other data to aid in the vehicle’s recovery.  Such information is also simultaneously sent to the vehicle owner’s computer or cell phone.  

In 1998, the company began offering its tracking system to the heavy machinery and construction industry, including entering into an agreement with Caterpillar.

By 2013, the LoJack system was reportedly operating in 28 states and the District of Columbia and in more than 30 countries. The company reported that more than 1,800 U.S. law enforcement agencies had LoJack tracking computers in their police vehicles. In November 2013, the company announced they were expanding tracking capabilities to parents, auto makers and insurance companies.

In March 2016, the company was acquired for $134 million by CalAmp, an Irvine, California-based provider of Internet of things (IoT) software applications, cloud services, data intelligence and telematics products and services.

In March 2021, the vehicle intelligence company Spireon announced it had acquired the LoJack U.S. Stolen Vehicle Recovery business from CalAmp, joining LoJack users with "nearly 4 million active subscribers from over 20,000 current Spireon customers". CalAmp would still retain and continue to expand LoJack International, which operates as a subscription-based SaaS business, while also retaining ownership of the LoJack patents and trademarks. Under Spireon, LoJack technology moved from RF-based location to GPS and cellular-based technology, growing availability of the solution throughout the U.S. and Hawaii and expanding the solution from only stolen vehicle recovery into connected car technology for both dealers and consumers.

See also
Carjacking
Comparison of device tracking software
Connected car
LoJack for Laptops
Motor vehicle theft
Radio direction finder
Vehicle tracking system

References

Automotive accessories
Companies based in Massachusetts
Motor vehicle theft
Security technology
Wireless locating
Geopositioning
Technology companies based in Massachusetts